Sir Norman Samuel Wooding  (20 April 1927 – 27 June 2005) was a leading British industrialist with a PhD in chemistry. He was also a friend of former chancellor of the University of Bath, Sir Frank Kearton, later Lord Kearton.

Sir Norman Wooding wrote a memoir titled Norman Wooding Recollections, which was published by The Memoir Club.

References

1927 births
2005 deaths
20th-century British businesspeople
Businesspeople awarded knighthoods
Commanders of the Order of the British Empire
Knights Bachelor